Gordon Bradley Hindle (1919–2006) was a British archaeologist and historian who was Editor, President and Vice-President of the Lancashire and Cheshire Antiquarian Society and Treasurer of the Chetham Society.

Life 
Hindle was a Member of the Chetham Society serving as Council Member (1983–2005) and Treasurer (1984–89). He was also a Member of the Lancashire and Cheshire Antiquarian Society, serving as Council Member (1972–2005), Editor (1975–88), President (1994–97), and Vice-President (1997–2005).

Select bibliography 
 Provision for the Relief of the Poor in Manchester, 1754–1826, Chetham Society, Third Series, 22 (1975). .

References 

1919 births
2006 deaths
British archaeologists
Lancashire and Cheshire Antiquarian Society
Chetham Society